Kodaikanal taluk is a taluk of Dindigul district of the Indian state of Tamil Nadu. The headquarters of the taluk is the town of Kodaikanal.

Demographics
According to the 2011 census, the taluk of Kodaikanal had a population of 114,999 with 57,853  males and 57,146 females. There were 988 women for every 1000 men. The taluk had a literacy rate of 72.44. Child population in the age group below 6 was 5,644 males and 5,505 females.

References 

Taluks of Dindigul district